Smilen Mlyakov (born 17 June 1981 in Sofia) is a Bulgarian volleyball player.

Career

Mlyakov has played for  CSKA Royal Cake and Levski Ball in his country as well as had spells in Italy, Poland and Iran. He is a former member of his country's national team.

References

1981 births
Living people
Sportspeople from Sofia
Bulgarian men's volleyball players